Amwaj Islands (transliterated: Juzur Amwaj) are a group of man-made islands, located in the Persian Gulf to the northeast of Bahrain, near the coast of Muharraq island.

Geography
Amwaj Islands have an area of 4.31 km2.

The Amwaj Islands were reclaimed from the relatively shallow seas to the northeast of Muharraq Island, which is the northernmost island in the Kingdom of Bahrain.

History
In the year 2000, a plan was created for a pioneering project in Bahrain, the first to offer 100% freehold land ownership to expatriates living in the Kingdom of Bahrain, was devised; thus came the plan of Amwaj Islands. The plan was also to increase the supply of waterfront property which is in low supply in this small island nation. The project is being developed by Oasis Real Estate Development Company with an investment of 1.5 billion US dollars
In 2002 the project started taking form. The first phase was completed in 2003. the second in 2004, when Cisco and Oracle began laying fabric for communications on the islands. 
At 2016, Amwaj Islands saw the completion of infrastructure such as electricity, roads, water, sewerage and telecoms, and became fit for residential use.

Over the past decade, a series of hotels have also opened on the island such as the Art Rotana, The Grove Hotel, Ramada Hotel and Suites, The Sea Loft and the Dragon Hotel. In 2012, entrepreneur Yara Salman opened 'Yara Beauty Salon', a luxury beauty salon in the islands. The salon features a variety of beauty treatments, including Moroccan baths, a solarium, and cryotherapy suites. Salman was the first to introduce the concept of cryotherapy to Bahrain, which is used to treat minor tissue damage and can be "effective in cellulite reduction and calorie-burning".

Description
From an engineering perspective Amwaj introduced a number of new technologies to the region including geotubes for the reclamation phase of these islands, vacuum sewerage and fiber optic "Smart City" technology among others.
The Islands contain residential, commercial (highrise) and hotel and retail buildings, as well as a 240 m diameter circular marina with over 140 berths.

Administration
The island belongs to Muharraq Governorate.

Transportation 
Amwaj Islands are connected to Muharraq Island by two causeways, each about 1 km in length. 
The distance between the new island and Bahrain International Airport is only 4.5 km.

Image gallery

References

External links 

 
Detailed map

Muharraq
List of tourist attractions in Bahrain

Populated places in the Muharraq Governorate
Islands of Bahrain
Artificial islands of Bahrain
Islands of the Persian Gulf